Popup, Pop up or pop-up may refer to:

Arts, entertainment, and media
 Pop Up (album), a 2007 album by Yelle
 Pop Up (video game), a video game also known as Bumpy
 Pop-up book, a book with three-dimensional pages

Computing
 Pop-up (video gaming), or pop up graphics, a phenomenon associated with limited draw distance in 3D video games
 Pop-up ad, a form of web advertising that appears in a new window
 Context menu or pop-up menu, an element of computer interaction
 Modal window or pop-up dialog boxes, a child window that blocks user interaction to the parent window

Sports
 Pop-up, a kind of batted ball in baseball
 Pop-up, an easily attackable ball in the sport of pickleball
 Boilie, a buoyant fishing bait also known as pop-ups

Temporary events
 Pop-up exhibition, a temporary art exhibition
 Pop-up restaurant, a temporary restaurant
 Pop-up retail, short-term sales space

Other uses
 Pop-up, a type of air tactic employed in standoff situations
 Pop-up Globe, a theatre in new Zealand
 Pop-up headlamps or hidden headlights
 Popup camper, a type of recreational vehicle

See also
 Jack in the Box (disambiguation)